Milan Sedláček (1 October 1961 – 20 May 2012) was a Czech mountaineer. In 2002, he climbed his first eight-thousander Shishapangma. In 2005 and 2007 respectively he unsuccessfully tried to climb K2. In 2010, he tried to climb Lhotse but reached only 7,800 m. He died on the descent of Lhotse in 2012.

References

1961 births
2012 deaths
Czech mountain climbers
Mountaineering deaths